Moleprovod is a rural locality (a village) in Osinovskoye Rural Settlement of Vinogradovsky District, Arkhangelsk Oblast, Russia. The population was 1 as of 2010.

Geography 
Moleprovod is located on the Severnaya Dvina River, 2 km northeast of Bereznik (the district's administrative centre) by road. Bereznik is the nearest rural locality.

References 

Rural localities in Vinogradovsky District